The rove beetles are a family (Staphylinidae) of beetles, primarily distinguished by their short elytra (wing covers) that typically leave more than half of their abdominal segments exposed. With roughly 63,000 species in thousands of genera, the group is currently recognized as the largest extant family of organisms. It is an ancient group, with fossilized rove beetles known from the Triassic, 200 million years ago, and possibly even earlier if the genus Leehermania proves to be a member of this family. They are an ecologically and morphologically diverse group of beetles, and commonly encountered in terrestrial ecosystems.

One well-known species is the devil's coach-horse beetle (Ocypus olens). For some other species, see list of British rove beetles.

Anatomy
As might be expected for such a large family, considerable variation exists among the species. Colors range from yellow and red to reddish-brown to brown to black to iridescent blue and green. The antennae usually have 11 segments and are filiform, with moderate clubbing in some genera. The abdomen may be very long and flexible, and some rove beetles superficially resemble earwigs.These beetles are able to fold themselves into a sort of origami shape. In the genera Paederinae, Euaesthetinae, and Osoriinae, and partially in Steninae, the tergum and sternum on the visible abdominal segments have fused, making each segment ring-shaped.

Some rove beetles, including members of Antimerus and Phanolinus, are metallic in appearance.

Some members of Paederina (specifically the genus Paederus), a subtribe of Paederinae, contain a potent vesicant in their haemolymph that can produce a skin irritation called dermatitis linearis, also known as Paederus dermatitis. The irritant pederin is highly toxic, more potent than cobra venom.

Ecology
Rove beetles are known from every type of habitat in which beetles occur, and their diets include just about everything except the living tissues of higher plants, but now including higher plants with the discovery of the diet of Himalusa thailandensis. Most rove beetles are predators of insects and other invertebrates, living in forest leaf litter and similar decaying plant matter. They are also commonly found under stones, and around freshwater margins. 
Almost 400 species are known to live on ocean shores that are submerged at high tide, including the pictured rove beetle, although these are much fewer than 1% of the worldwide total of Staphylinidae. Other species have adapted to live as inquilines in ant and termite colonies, and some live in mutualistic relationships with mammals whereby they eat fleas and other parasites, benefiting the host. A few species, notably those of the genus Aleochara, are scavengers and carrion feeders, or are parasitoids of other insects, particularly of certain fly pupae. To profit from the alleged advantages, several Staphylinidae have been transferred into Italy, Hawaii, the continental United States and Easter Island by practitioners. Another advantage of rove beetles is their sensitivity to changes in the environment, such as habitat alteration. This means they have potential as an ecological disturbance indicator in human-dominated environments. 

Although rove beetles' appetites for other insects would seem to make them obvious candidates for biological control of pests, and empirically they are believed to be important controls in the wild, experiments using them have not been notably successful. Greater success is seen with those species that are parasitoids (genus Aleochara).

Rove beetles of the genus Stenus are very interesting insects. They are specialist predators of small invertebrates such as springtails (Collembola). Their labium can shoot out from the head using blood pressure. The thin rod of the labium ends in a pad of bristly hairs and hooks and between these hairs are small pores that exude an adhesive glue-like substance, which sticks to prey.

Systematics
Classification of the 63,650 (as of 2018) staphylinid species is ongoing and controversial, with some workers proposing an organization of as many as 10 separate families, but the current favored system is one of 32 subfamilies, about 167 tribes (some grouped into supertribes), and about 3,200 genera. About 400 new species are being described each year, and some estimates suggest three-quarters of tropical species are as yet undescribed.

References

 Ross H. Arnett, Jr. and Michael C. Thomas, American Beetles (CRC Press, 2001), vol. 1
 Betz O., Irmler, U. and Klimaszewski, J. (eds.) Biology of rove beetles (Staphylinidae) - Life history, evolution, ecology and distribution (Springer, 2018)

(Méndez-Rojas, Cultid-Medina and Escobar, 2022)

Important works
For the Palaearctic fauna, the most up-to-date works are:
 Lohse, G.A. (1964) Familie: Staphylinidae. In: Freude, H., Harde, K.W. & Lohse, G.A. (Eds.), Die Käfer Mitteleuropas. Band 4, Staphylinidae I (Micropeplinae bis Tachyporinae). Krefeld: Goecke & Evers Verlag, 264 pp.
 Lohse, G.A. (1974) Familie: Staphylinidae. In: Freude, H., Harde, K.W. & Lohse, G.A. (Eds.), Die Käfer Mitteleuropas. Band 5, Staphylinidae II (Hypocyphtinae und Aleocharinae). Pselaphidae. Krefeld: Goecke & Evers Verlag, 381 pp.
 Lohse, G.A. (1989) Ergänzungen und Berichtigungen zu Freude-Harde-Lohse "Die Käfer Mitteleuropas" Band 5 (1974), pp. 185–243 In: Lohse, G.A. & Lucht, W.H. (Eds.), Die Käfer Mitteleuropas. 1. Supplementband mit Katalogteil. Krefeld: Goecke & Evers Verlag, pp. 185–243.

Regional works
Europe
 Lott, D.A. (2009). The Staphylinidae (rove beetles) of Britain and Ireland. Part 5: Scaphidiinae, Piestinae, Oxytelinae. Handbooks for the identification of British insects, vol. 12, part 5. St Albans: Royal Entomological Society. British and Irish fauna only
 Tronquet, M. (2006). Catalogue iconographique des Coléoptères des Pyrénées-Orientales. Vol. 1: Staphylinidae. Supplément au Tome XV de la Revue de l’Association Roussillonnaise d’Entomologie. Perpignan: Association Roussillonnaise d’Entomologie.Extensively illustrated

External links

 Digital Library of Early Works on Staphylinidae
 Catalog of the Staphylinidae1758 to the end of the second millennium.
 rove beetles of the world on the UF / IFAS Featured Creatures Web site
 rove beetles of Florida on the UF / IFAS Featured Creatures Web site

Staphylinidae
Articles containing video clips
Taxa named by Auguste Lameere